Santa Rosa Correctional Institution is a state prison for men located in Milton, Santa Rosa County, Florida, United States, owned and operated by the Florida Department of Corrections. The facility opened in 1996 with a mix of security levels and a capacity of 1,614. It is often considered one of the "toughest" and "most dangerous" prisons in the state of Florida.  

The adjacent Santa Rosa Correctional Institution Annex opened in 2006, and houses another 1,478 inmates at the same security levels.  

Also nearby is the privately operated Blackwater River Correctional Facility with Florida state inmates.

References

External links 

 "Lockup" documentary on Santa Rosa 
 Miami Herald investigation of an inmate death in 2013

Prisons in Florida
Buildings and structures in Santa Rosa County, Florida
1996 establishments in Florida